Jamshidian's trick is a technique for one-factor asset price models, which re-expresses an option on a portfolio of assets as a portfolio of options. It was developed by Farshid Jamshidian in 1989.

The trick relies on the following simple, but very useful mathematical observation. Consider a sequence of monotone (increasing) functions  of one real variable (which map onto ), a random variable , and a constant . 

Since the function  is also increasing and maps onto , there is a unique solution  to the equation 

Since the functions  are increasing: 

In financial applications, each of the random variables  represents an asset value, the number  is the strike of the option on the portfolio of assets. We can therefore express the payoff of an option on a portfolio of assets in terms of a portfolio of options on the individual assets  with corresponding strikes .

References
Jamshidian, F. (1989). "An exact bond option pricing formula," Journal of Finance, Vol 44, pp 205-209

Mathematical finance
Fixed income analysis
Financial models